Portrait of the Marquise de la Solana is a 1795 full length portrait by Francisco Goya of his friend the Marquise de la Solana. It now hangs in the Louvre in Paris, to which it was given in 1953 by Carlos de Beistegui.

See also
List of works by Francisco Goya

Sources 
  Rita Barrenechea.
  Catalogue entry

External links

Paintings in the Louvre by Spanish artists
Marquise de la Solana
Marquise de la Solana
1795 paintings
Marquise de Solana